Frakk, a macskák réme (lit. Frakk, the terror of the cats) is a Hungarian television show, written by Ágnes Bálint. The series was produced between 1971 and 1985, and used cutout animation.

Frakk is a hungarian "vizsla" dog, who living his life with a typical, sometimes ironically depicted married couple. Frakk, whose name means 'tailcoat' in English, lives together with Uncle Charles (Károly bácsi) and Aunt Irma (Irma néni), two Hungarian pensioners along with their two cats, Lucrezia and Meek, one of them black and the other white. Due to an old rivalry, the three constantly get into fights which are exacerbated by the strict attitude of Aunt Irma, who favors the two cats as opposed to Uncle Charles, who takes the dog's side.

The show was written by Agnes Bálint in 1971. Music by Zsolt Pethő. The 1st season's first episode created in 1971 (showed in 1972), the 2nd season was created in 1972 (showed in 1973), and a 3rd season came in 1978 (showed in 1979), the 4th season created in 1984 (the season showed in 1987 or 1988). The show was very popular in Hungary and is considered one of the top animated shows that defined the decade of the 1970s for Hungarian children.

List of the Seasons/Episodes

Season 1 

 Diadal
 Éji zene
 A betegápoló
 Egerészni jó
 Fő a kényelem!
 Árulás
 Élőkép
 Éjszaka fényei
 Szerénke művelődik
 Egy kis kényeztetés
 Elégtétel
 Pancsi-pancsi
 Bizsu

Season 2 

 Karácsonyi angyalkák
 Macskabál
 Számtanóra
 A szomszéd kakas
 Lábnyomok a vetésben
 Beteglátogatók
 A kerékpár
 Majd mi megmutatjuk
 A sonka ízű sajt
 Ó, mely sok hal…
 A megszokott kerékvágás
 Kedves emlék
 Vándorcirkusz

Season 3 

 De jó sport a foci
 Vegyünk neki labdát
 A művelt eb
 Egér pongyolában
 Nyesőolló díszdobozban
 Egy tollseprű tündöklése
 Hajrá, vadmacskák!
 Ki táncol Lukréciával?
 A falkatárs
 A csúzli
 Gumicsont
 Cinkemama küldi
 Mit hoz a Télapó?

Season 4 (the last season) 

 Rézlakodalom
 Kolbászkiállítás
 Régiségek
 Hol vadász, hol juhász
 A kiskutya pizsamája
 Az irigy kutya karácsonya
 Gyere, kiskutyám!
 A gyűjtemény
 Zöld erdőben jártam
 Kis kacsa fürdik
 Csónaktúra
 Egy cica… két cica…
 Oh, az édes otthon

References

1970s Hungarian television series
Animated television series about dogs
Fictional dogs
Hungarian animated television series
Hungarian children's television series
Male characters in animation
Television characters introduced in 1971